Miguel Ângelo Silva Duarte Oliveira Pinto, known as Miguel Ângelo (born 5 January 1970) is a Portuguese football coach and a former player.

Club career
He made his Primeira Liga debut for Beira-Mar on 29 August 1998 in a game against Porto.

Honours
Beira-Mar
Taça de Portugal: 1998–99

References

External links
 

1970 births
People from São João da Madeira
Living people
Portuguese footballers
A.D. Sanjoanense players
C.D. Feirense players
Liga Portugal 2 players
S.C. Beira-Mar players
Primeira Liga players
Portuguese football managers
Association football midfielders
Sportspeople from Aveiro District